Marcus Bagley (born October 23, 2001) is an American college basketball player for the Arizona State Sun Devils of the Pac-12 Conference.

High school career
As a freshman, Bagley played basketball with his older brother, Marvin III, at Sierra Canyon School in Chatsworth, Los Angeles. In his sophomore year, he attended Ravenscroft School in Raleigh, North Carolina, moving close to Marvin, who was playing for Duke. Bagley did not join the basketball team in part due to a knee injury. For his junior season, Bagley transferred to Sheldon High School in Sacramento, California, after his brother was drafted by the Sacramento Kings. As a junior, he averaged 19.9 points and 7.9 rebounds per game, leading his team to the Open Division state title game. He shared The Sacramento Bee Player of the Year honors with teammate Justin Nguyen. His senior season was cut short during the state playoffs due to COVID-19 measures. He was limited to 17 games because of injuries, averaging 22 points and 8.8 rebounds per game.

Recruiting
On July 29, 2019, Bagley committed to playing college basketball for Arizona State over offers from California and Arizona.

College career
Bagley averaged 10.8 points and 6.2 rebounds per game as a freshman at Arizona State. He was limited to 12 games due to calf and ankle injuries. On April 6, 2021, he declared for the 2021 NBA draft. He maintained his college eligibility and entered the transfer portal. He later withdrew from the draft and announced that he is returning to Arizona State for his sophomore season. On November 15, 2021, Bagley suffered a knee injury during a 72–63 win over North Florida. After playing two games in the 2022 season, Bagley was suspended for making comments about head coach Bobby Hurley after a game against Northern Arizona. After missing the next 5 games, he send a tweet explaining why he didn't play. On November 29, 2022, he then tweeted that he got suspended for more games for making the previous tweets. He subsequently tweeted "ATHLETES please please please make a well thought through decision where you go to school. These people will tell you anything to build you up just to tear you down." After a game against Stanford, Bobby Hurley announced that Bagley had "stepped away" from the team.

Career statistics

College

|-
| style="text-align:left;"| 2020–21
| style="text-align:left;"| Arizona State
| 12 || 11 || 29.2 || .387 || .347 || .719 || 6.2 || 1.2 || .8 || .4 || 10.8
|-
| style="text-align:left;"| 2021–22
| style="text-align:left;"| Arizona State
| 3 || 3 || 22.7 || .385 || .385 || .714 || 4.0 || 1.3 || .3 || .0 || 10.0
|- class="sortbottom"
| style="text-align:center;" colspan="2"| Career
| 15 || 14 || 27.9 || .386 || .353 || .718 || 5.7 || 1.2 || .7 || .3 || 10.7

Personal life
Bagley's older brother, Marvin III, plays in the NBA and was the second overall pick in the 2018 draft. He is the grandson of former Olympic and professional basketball player Joe Caldwell. His father, Marvin Jr., played college football at North Carolina A&T.

References

External links
Arizona State Sun Devils bio

2001 births
Living people
American men's basketball players
Basketball players from Arizona
Sportspeople from Tempe, Arizona
Arizona State Sun Devils men's basketball players
Small forwards
Sierra Canyon School alumni